Allan's Island Radar Station (Cinco) was a United States Army General Surveillance Ground Radar Early Warning Station in the Dominion of Newfoundland. It was built during World War II and responsible for monitoring air traffic from Naval Station Argentia to Gander and into the Gulf of St. Lawrence. It was closed in 1945.

History
The site was established in 1942 as a United States Ground Radar Early Warning Station, funded by the United States Army, which stationed the 685th Air Warning Squadron on the site under operational control of Newfoundland Base Command at Pepperrell Air Force Base. The station was assigned to Royal Canadian Air Force in November 1944, and was given designation "No 40 RU". The RCAF operated the station until November 1, 1945.

It operated an SCR-270 manned Early-warning radar.

United States Army Air Forces units and assignments 
Units:
 685th Air Warning Squadron, 1943
 Inactivated November 1944

Assignments:
 Newfoundland Base Command, Winter 1943

References

Bibliography
 Cornett, Lloyd H. and Johnson, Mildred W., A Handbook of Aerospace Defense Organization 1946 – 1980, Office of History, Aerospace Defense Center, Peterson AFB, CO (1980)
 Winkler, David F. & Webster, Julie L., Searching the Skies, The Legacy of the United States Cold War Defense Radar Program,  US Army Construction Engineering Research Laboratories, Champaign, IL (1997)

Radar stations of the United States Air Force
Installations of the United States Air Force in Canada
Military installations closed in 1945
Military installations in Newfoundland and Labrador
Military installations established in 1943